Keate is an English surname. Notable people with the surname include:

 John Keate (1773–1852), English schoolmaster
 Robert Keate (1777–1857), British surgeon
 Robert William Keate (1814–1873), English cricketer and British colonial administrator

English-language surnames